Four Boxes is a 2009 low-budget horror thriller starring Justin Kirk, Terryn Westbrook and Sam Rosen. The film was written, produced and directed by the husband-and-wife team Wyatt McDill and Megan Huber of Minneapolis.
The 85-minute film, which cost $40,000 to produce, debuted at the 2009 South by Southwest film festival.

The film is about three people who run an online auction business disposing of the possessions of recently deceased people.
They move into a house they have to clear out, and discover on the computer a bookmarked website. This newly discovered website plays four webcams that are hidden in the apartment of a hooded bombmaker who is unaware he is being watched.

Cast 
 Justin Kirk as Trevor Grainger
 Terryn Westbrook as Amber Croft
 Sam Rosen as Rob Rankrus
 Bain Boehlke as Neighbor
 David Tufford as Bill Zill

References

External links
 
 

American independent films
American horror thriller films
2009 films
2000s horror thriller films
2009 horror films
2009 directorial debut films
2000s English-language films
2000s American films